The 2007–08 season was the 93rd season of the Isthmian League, which is an English football competition featuring semi-professional and amateur clubs from London, East and South East England.

Premier Division

The Premier Division consisted of 22 clubs, including 17 clubs from the previous season, and five new clubs:
 AFC Hornchurch, promoted as champions of Division One North
 Harlow Town, promoted as play-off winners in Division One North
 Hastings United, promoted as play-off winners in Division One South
 Maidstone United, promoted as champions of Division One South
 Wealdstone, transferred from the Southern Football League Premier Division

Chelmsford City won the division and were promoted to the Conference South along with play-off winners AFC Wimbledon, who earned a third promotion in the six-year history of the reborn club. East Thurrock United, Folkestone Invicta and Leyton were relegated to the Division One sections while Boreham Wood were reprieved from relegation due to Conference clubs Halifax Town folding and Nuneaton Borough being demoted two divisions down.

League table

Top scorers

Play-offs

Stadia and locations

Division One North

Division One North consisted of 22 clubs, including 18 clubs from the previous season, and four new clubs:
 Brentwood Town, promoted as champions of the Essex Senior League
 Dartford, transferred from Division One South
 Edgware Town, promoted as champions of the Spartan South Midlands League
 Northwood, relegated from the Southern Football League Premier Division

Dartford won the division and were promoted to the Premier Division along with play-off winners Canvey Island. Wivenhoe Town finished bottom of the table and left the league. Ilford finished in the relegation zone for the second season in a row, but were reprieved again after Edgware Town resigned from the league at the end of the season due to lack of the funds.

League table

Top scorers

Play-offs

Stadia and locations

Division One South

Division One South consisted of 22 clubs, including 17 clubs from the previous season, and five new clubs:
 Chipstead, promoted as champions of the Combined Counties League
 Eastbourne Town, promoted as champions of the Sussex County League
 Walton & Hersham, relegated from the Premier Division
 Whitstable Town, promoted as champions of the Kent League
 Worthing, relegated from the Premier Division

Dover Athletic won the division and were promoted to the Premier Division along with play-off winners Tooting & Mitcham United. Horsham YMCA and Molesey finished bottom of the table and left the league.

League table

Top scorers

Play-offs

Stadia and locations

League Cup

The Isthmian League Cup 2007–08 was the 34th season of the Isthmian League Cup, the league cup competition of the Isthmian League. Sixty-six clubs took part. The competition commenced on 11 September 2007 and finished on 2 April 2008.

Calendar

Fixtures and results
Fixtures are listed in alphabetical order, not that which they were drawn in.

First round
Four clubs from division Ones participated in the first round, while all other clubs received a bye to the second round.

Second round
The two clubs to have made it through the first round were entered into the second round draw with all other Isthmian League clubs, making sixty-four teams.

Third round

Fourth round

Quarterfinals

Semifinals

Final

See also
Isthmian League
2007–08 Northern Premier League
2007–08 Southern Football League

References

External links
Official website

2007-08
7